Drop is a collaborative album by Porcupine Tree drummer Gavin Harrison and multi-instrumentalist, vocalist and extended-range bass player 05Ric. It was released on the Burning Shed record label in 2007.

Reception
The review by Johan Vaxelaire in Wusik Magazine states: "The qualities present here are the excellent instrument playing of Gavin Harrison on drums; the incredible vocal harmonies, sense, and inventiveness and originality of 05ric’s bass playing. The close relationship between technique and emotion makes this a disk showcasing technical skill and yet so pleasant to listen to from beginning to end."

Track listing
 "Unsettled" – 5:45 
 "Sailing" – 4:45 
 "Life" – 4:23 
 "Sometime" – 6:55 
 "For Lack Of" – 5:10 
 "Clock" – 4:10 
 "Okay" – 4:05 
 "Where Are You Going?" – 4:40 
 "Centered" – 5:33

All songs written by Gavin Harrison & 05Ric

Personnel
Gavin Harrison – drums, tapped guitar
05Ric – extended-range bass, vocals
Robert Fripp – guitar on "Sailing"
Dave Stewart – keyboards on "Centered"
Gary Sanctuary – keyboards on "Where Are You Going?"

References

External links
GH05ric MySpace page
www.burningshed.com

2007 albums
Collaborative albums